Robert Kechichian (born 1946) is a French-Armenian film director, actor and  screenwriter known for his work on Aram, Taxi 2 and other films.

Filmography
Assistant director:
Joyeuses Pâques (Georges Lautner)
Maladie d'amour and Les Bois noirs (Jacques Deray)
Beaumarchais, l'insolent (Édouard Molinaro) 
Asterix & Obelix: Mission Cleopatra (Alain Chabat)

Director:
 Brûlez Rome! (2005) (TV)
 Aram (2002)

External links

French people of Armenian descent
French film directors
1946 births
Living people